Godwin Awoke is an Anglican bishop in Nigeria: he has been Bishop of Ngbo since 2018.

Notes

Living people
Anglican bishops of Ngbo
21st-century Anglican bishops in Nigeria
Year of birth missing (living people)